PIDO stands for Process Integration and Design Optimization. Process Integration is needed as many software tools are used in a multi-domain system design. Control software is developed in a different toolchain than the mechanical properties of a system, where structural analysis is done using again some different tools. To be able to optimize a certain design, communication between these tools is required.

The end goal, design optimization, can be reached by defining cost functions and defining the parameters which can be changed to fit the design within the cost function(s).

See also
 ModelCenter from Phoenix Integration, Inc.
 ModeFRONTIER from Esteco
 Optimus from Noesis Solutions
 pSeven from DATADVANCE
 optiSLang from Ansys
 RCE from DLR
 Hyperstudy from Altair, Inc.
 Heeds from Siemens

External links 
 PIAnO from PIDOTECH Inc.
 Isight from Dassault Systèmes SIMULIA Corp
 VisualDOC from Vanderplaats R&D, Inc.
 CAESES from Friendship-Systems AG
Computer-aided design software